Jilma Madera (September 18, 1915 – February 21, 2000) was a well-known Cuban sculptor.  Her two most famous works are the Christ of Havana and the bust of José Martí at the Pico Turquino.

Born in La Victoria, Pinar del Río, Cuba, she studied painting and sculpture at the Escuela Nacional de Bellas Artes "San Alejandro" under the tutelage of Juan José Sicre (the sculptor of the José Martí Memorial).

Her statue of the Christ of Havana was a commission she won in 1953 during the government of Fulgencio Batista.  It was done in Carrara marble and is 60 feet tall and weighs 320 tons. It is composed of 67 pieces that were brought from Italy, where Madera carved the statue and was blessed there by Pope Pius XII. It was inaugurated on December 24, 1958, just two weeks before the fall of the Batista government.

She worked and made some exhibitions at New York's Sculpture Center, in USA, and exhibited other works at the City of Havana Local Council (Ayuntamiento de la Habana), the Lyceum and Lawn Tennis Club, and some painting and sculpture national exhibition halls, in Cuba.

Her bust of José Martí was done in 1953 and placed at the Pico Turquino during the centennial celebrations of Martí's birth in 1963 by Celia Sanchez.

The history of why this statue was created was told to be that Batitisa's wife prayed so hard that her husband would not be killed in the violent beginning of the revolution, that she commissioned this monument to show her gratitude for her answered prayers, however this may be an urban legend.

References
Gretel Báez Padrón; Lic: Mayra Isabel Sajión Sánchez, Lic: Felina González Hernández. "Lilia Gilma Madera Valiente, escultora" (in Spanish).

Modern sculptors
1915 births
2000 deaths
Cuban sculptors
20th-century sculptors